This article refers to crime in the U.S. state of Wisconsin.

Statistics
In 2008, there were 170,868 crimes reported in Wisconsin, including 146 murders. In 2014, there were 136,952 crimes reported, including 165 murders.

Capital punishment laws

Capital punishment is not applied in this state.

References